Vision (formerly SKTF and Sveriges Kommunaltjänstemannaförbund) is a trade union in Sweden, generally representing white-collar workers in municipalities, county councils and churches.

Vision has almost 200,000 members in a variety of professional groups, such as managers, social security officers, engineers, administrators, medical secretaries and dental practitioners.

Vision is a Fair Union and was the first trade union to use the concept (2007).

The organisation was founded in 1936 and is affiliated with the Swedish Confederation of Professional Employees, and Public Services International.

References 

Swedish Confederation of Professional Employees
Public Services International
Trade unions in Sweden
1936 establishments in Sweden
Trade unions established in 1936
Organizations based in Stockholm
Municipal workers' trade unions